Brightline West is a proposed privately run high-speed rail route linking Las Vegas Valley and Rancho Cucamonga in the Greater Los Angeles area through the California high desert. The line will connect with existing rail at Rancho Cucamonga station of Metrolink's San Bernardino Line, a commuter rail line in Southern California. The project is intended to provide an alternative to air and automobile travel between Southern California and Las Vegas, a popular vacation spot. Construction on the route is expected to begin in 2023 pending project permits finalization from Federal Railroad Administration in March 2023, and revenue service is planned to begin in 2027.

The line was developed starting in 2005 as DesertXpress and has passed through several developers and investors. In September 2018, the project known as XpressWest,  was acquired by Fortress Investment Group, which owns Brightline in Florida, the only privately run inter-city rail route in the United States. An extension from Victor Valley to the California High-Speed Rail station in Palmdale is also under consideration.

Context

Las Vegas is a gambling and tourist destination for the Greater Los Angeles area with Interstate 15 being a direct route between the two regions. Travel by automobile takes over four hours while scheduled buses cover the route in five to seven hours. The highway carries heavy traffic on Thursday, Friday, and Sunday which causes significant delays. Motorists returning to Los Angeles on Sunday can create a  backup. Airlines have direct flights, but traffic and security at the airport add time to the short flight. Las Vegas lost its last passenger train service in 1997 when Amtrak canceled the Desert Wind.

Project development

DesertXpress
The original plan under the name DesertXpress was to provide an alternative to automobile travel and airline travel between the Los Angeles area and the Las Vegas area along Interstate 15. The city of Victorville was selected as the location for the westernmost terminal as extending the train line farther into the Los Angeles Basin through the Cajon Pass was considered to be prohibitively expensive. The station would include free parking and through-checking of baggage straight to the Las Vegas Strip resorts. A future extension would have included a new link to the California High-Speed Rail station in Palmdale.

DesertXpress Enterprises, LLC was founded in 2005 to develop, construct, own and operate the high-speed rail project. 70% of the company were held by Anthony A. Marnell II of Marnell Corrao Associates through his DX, LLC company whereas Gary Tharaldson and François Badeau held 20 and 10%, respectively. The preparation of a first Federal Railroad Administration-Environmental Impact Statement (EIS) was started in 2006.

The total cost of the link between Apple Valley and Las Vegas was expected to be around US$5 billion. In March 2010, project planners said they could obtain the full funding amount through exclusively private investors, but had also applied for a $4.9 billion loan through the federal Railroad Rehabilitation & Improvement Financing program. As of October 2011, the start of the project was contingent on receiving a $6 billion loan from the federal government, the approval or denial of which was expected in mid-2012.

A preferred design was identified with the release of the Final Environmental Impact Statement on April 1, 2011, which began a public comment period that ended on May 2, 2011. The federal government approved the design on July 8, 2011, and the planned route was approved by the Surface Transportation Board on October 26, 2011.

The train would travel at speeds of up to  averaging  and making the  trip from Victorville to Las Vegas in about 1 hour 24 minutes. In March 2010, executives with the project said they expected construction to begin in 2010. In October 2011, construction was planned to begin in the last quarter of 2012, with completion in the last quarter of 2016, subject to funding.

Transformation to XpressWest 
In June 2012, the developer announced the new plan to build a network of high-speed rail for the region by expanding to Arizona, Utah and Colorado. The initial phase was to include high-speed tracks, Las Vegas to Apple Valley and Apple Valley to Palmdale.

The  link between Las Vegas and Victorville was designed to be double-tracked which is dedicated for the high-speed trains. The costs of this section was estimated at $6.9 billion. The developer would put up $1.4 billion in private investment and the rest of funding would borrowed under the Railroad Rehabilitation and Improvement Financing program provided by the Federal Railroad Administration.

Future plans include a link between Las Vegas and Phoenix, Arizona, and another from Las Vegas to Salt Lake City, Utah, and Denver, Colorado. The project was subsequently rebranded to XpressWest to reflect the expanded mission.

The link would initially connect to the Metrolink system in Palmdale. This would allow passengers to complete a train ride between Los Angeles and Las Vegas with one transfer by using Metrolink in the Los Angeles area and a transfer to the high-speed train at Palmdale station. The station would eventually connect with California High-Speed Rail, and is designed to have the same specifications and technology, allowing it to continue on California High-Speed Rail further into Burbank and Los Angeles. The early estimate of the costs for this link was $1.5 billion and the earliest environmental work was to be completed by the end of 2013. The date of the service for this link has not been determined.

Joint venture 
In February 2013, the federal loan remained unapproved and construction was not expected to start until mid-2014 at the earliest.

Representative Paul Ryan (R-WI), the chairman of the House Budget Committee and senator Jeff Sessions(R-AL), the ranking minority member of the Senate Committee on the Budget were the main opponents to the federal loan application of XpressWest. They argued that the project represented high risk to the taxpayer. They wrote to then-Transportation Secretary Ray LaHood in March 2013 and recommended the administration to reject the loan application. The letter indicated that the total cost was estimated to be $6.9 billion. The $1.4 billion would come from the private sources and the remaining $5.5 billion would come from the federal loan. The letter cited a taxpayer risk analysis report as a basis of their recommendation.

In July 2013, there were reports that loan was indefinitely suspended, which were later confirmed by the federal government, which said that it had been suspended in part due to the failure of the application in regard to the "Buy America" policy which required applicants to use American-made products. Despite the indefinite suspension of the federal loan application, which was viewed as a denial of the application, the developer indicated that the XpressWest project would proceed without providing the details on financial plan.

In 2014, Nevada Senator Harry Reid mentioned that the federal loan request may resurface, but little had been seen so far of the project's continued viability. In 2015, the Nevada High-Speed Rail Authority was proposed to look into the feasibility of high-speed rail into southern Nevada from California, possibly XpressWest. The bill was first introduced on April 7, 2015, and was passed by the legislature on May 20, 2015, by a vote of 40–1, and was approved by the Governor on May 27, 2015.

On September 17, 2015, XpressWest and the newly formed China Railway International USA (a consortium of Chinese rail industry companies) announced a joint venture to design, build, and operate the service between Las Vegas and Palmdale, with construction planned to begin in September 2016. A CAHSRA spokesperson said that there have been ongoing discussions concerning allowing the trains to use California High-Speed Rail lines to go further into the Los Angeles area, although no commitments had been made.

In June 2016, XpressWest announced that the joint venture had been called off. The biggest reason cited for the termination of the joint venture was a federal regulation requiring the manufacture of the high speed trains inside the United States. XpressWest said that they are "undeterred by this development and remains dedicated to completing its high-speed passenger rail project."

Brightline project 
On September 18, 2018, Fortress Investment Group, which owns an inter-city rail route in Florida called Brightline, announced that it would acquire the XpressWest project from Marnell, indicating that it would begin construction of the rail line in the second half of 2020 with expected completion in the second half of 2024. The project is expected to generate around 18,000 jobs at its peak. Los Angeles County finished an environmental assessment for the project in 2016 and by October 2019, design plans were almost 30% complete. In September 2020, the line was rebranded once again to Brightline West, and is being called "a Brightline affiliated company."

California and Nevada funding assistance 
A high speed line following the Palmdale–Apple Valley–Las Vegas route was included in the 2018 California State Rail Plan as part of the 2040 timeline of projects. Subsequently, the state of California issued tax-exempt, private activity bonds to XpressWest to partially fund construction. These bonds are meant to assist private ventures for the public interest.

In September 2019, it was announced that California would assist the project in funding. In October 2019 California Infrastructure and Economic Development Bank approved $3.25 billion in bonds and in April 2020, California government officials signed off on issuing $600 million in tax-exempt private activity bonds for XpressWest. The state of Nevada allocated the company an additional $200 million in private activity bonds in July 2020.

Cofounder and co-CEO of Fortress, Wes Edens, estimated the cost of construction at $8 billion in 2020. In September 2020, up to $3.2 billion in the tax-exempt, private activity bonds were offered. In November, it was decided to let the rights for the sale of the bonds lapse. A bond sale was planned for 2021 but was moved to 2022 to allow continued progress on project planning and for the bonds to be more attractive to investors.

The Los Angeles County Metropolitan Transportation Authority is also considering re-programming around $2 billion in Measure M funding slated for the High Desert Corridor, a proposed freeway between Victorville and Palmdale cancelled in October 2019, to instead create a development plan for an extension of the XpressWest route between the two cities.

The company is applying for funding from Infrastructure Investment and Jobs Act in which the application is due on April 21st, 2023.

Rancho Cucamonga extension
The company initiated planning on a rail line over the Cajon Pass to Rancho Cucamonga in June 2020. The Infrastructure Investment and Jobs Act passed in November 2021 has billions of dollars for rail projects which provides expanded opportunities for companies such as Brightline.

The environmental report for the Rancho Cucamonga route was released in November 2022. The environmental report includes the location of the proposed intermediate station in Hesperia. The report notes some mitigation measures will be necessary: temporary impacts on noise and wetlands, temporary and permanent impacts on some threatened or endangered species, visual impacts on views in the San Gabriel and San Bernardino Mountains, and traffic impacts around stations in Hesperia and Rancho Cucamonga. The report concludes that the project "will not result in a significant impact on the environment" or have "disproportionately high and adverse impacts" on low-income or minority populations.

Route

The tracks are planned to be laid within the median strip of Interstate 15, and sections would pass through federal land controlled by the Bureau of Land Management and National Park Service. The line is not planned to stop at intermediate cities, and would take 84 minutes to complete a one-way trip between Victor Valley and Las Vegas. While plans at first called for a fully double-track railway along the route, moving to the highway median led Brightline to revise the project and instead operate largely as a single track with passing sidings.

In the original plan, the route did not extend into Los Angeles due to the high cost of building rail in urban areas. The  extension from Victor Valley to the city of Palmdale, where it would connect to the proposed California High-Speed Rail system in order to provide service to Los Angeles, was not included in the initial phase. In June 2012, the new plan included the link between Victor Valley and Palmdale as part of construction for the first phase of the project. Passengers would transfer to Metrolink to access the Los Angeles area. In June 2020, the company initiated planning on a rail line south of Apple Valley over the Cajon Pass to Rancho Cucamonga to provide more direct Los Angeles service while also not ruling out the Palmdale expansion. The details of other sections have not been announced, but later phases may include extensions to Phoenix, Arizona; Salt Lake City, Utah; or Denver, Colorado.

In 2009, XpressWest estimated that it will carry around five million round trip passengers in the first full year of operation, with the company charging fares of around $50 for a one-way trip between Victorville and Las Vegas. In 2012, the round-trip fare was planned to be around $89, with trains expected to run every 20 minutes on peak and up to every 12 minutes as demand requires. , the stated frequency is 45 minutes between departures.

Stations
The Las Vegas station will be south of the Las Vegas Strip on Las Vegas Boulevard. The  site is across from the Premium Outlets South mall. The two-story station will feature retail and restaurant space. The Las Vegas station on Las Vegas Boulevard was announced in 2020 and the land was acquired in July 2021.

The proposed location of the Victor Valley station is in the northeast portion of the town of Apple Valley adjacent to I-15 at Dale Evans Parkway. A maintenance facility is also planned for this Victor Valley site.

A "one-seat" trip could continue into the Greater Los Angeles area with an extension to the Rancho Cucamonga Metrolink station. Service to a planned transit center incorporating the station will operate under the jurisdiction of the San Bernardino County Transportation Authority (SBCTA). A proposed  underground people-mover would provide a link to the Ontario International Airport. The Rancho Cucamonga extension includes an additional station in Hesperia in the median of I-15 at the Joshua St exit. Trains will make limited stops here in the morning and evening. The alternative extension to the Palmdale station would also connect to the existing Metrolink service into Los Angeles and link with the proposed California High Speed Rail.

Right of way agreements
The company entered into an agreement to lease the state-owned Interstate 15 right-of-way between Las Vegas and Victor Valley from California Department of Transportation (Caltrans), in June 2020. The 50-year lease is in the amount of $842,000 per year starting in 2020, adjusted according to the consumer price index every three years. A similar agreement for the Apple Valley to Rancho Cucamonga segment was signed in March 2023.

Brightline entered into a memorandum of understanding (MOU) with the San Bernardino County Transportation Authority in 2020 for the spur between Apple Valley to Rancho Cucamonga as it provided connectivity within the Inland Empire. Metrolink also approved a MOU to study the links to the Rancho Cucamonga and Palmdale Metrolink stations. A MOU was signed in October 2021 with the California State Transportation Agency, Caltrans, and California High-Speed Rail Authority for the use of  within Interstate 15 to Rancho Cucamonga.

Wildlife crossings
A  will keep vehicles away from rail line along the center divider of Interstate 15. This would prevent animals from making what is already a dangerous crossing of the freeway. Desert bighorn sheep once thrived in these mountain ranges though they now face many challenges. Wildlife researchers determined that wildlife crossings at Soda, Cady and Clark mountains could help sustain the sheep and other wildlife. Under an agreement with the California Department of Transportation and the California Department of Fish and Wildlife, wildlife crossings will cross over the freeway and the rail line at the three proposed locations. Hundreds of existing culverts and crossings under the Interstate will also be maintained or improved. Fencing to protect the desert tortoise and to exclude wildlife will be restored or installed as part of the project.

Rolling stock

The service is planned to utilize Siemens Velaro Novo rolling stock. Brightline would be the first customer of the Siemens Velaro Novo train, which is currently being tested in Germany using the ICE-S train

Vehicles will require a high power-to-weight ratio to climb the steep grades of up to 4.5% on the planned route: the Velaro series was designed for the German high speed rail system which has grades up to 4% on the Cologne–Frankfurt high-speed rail line. This is already a better "climbing" performance than specified by the European Union's Technical Specifications for Interoperability which mandate a maximum grade of 35 permille (3.5%).

See also
California-Nevada Interstate Maglev, a proposed maglev from Anaheim, California to Las Vegas.
Z-Train
Las Vegas Railway Express

References

Further reading
Federal Railroad Administration flyer regarding Desert Xpress scoping meetings
Federal Railroad Administration Posting of Environmental Impact Statement

External links

Proposed railway lines in California
Proposed railway lines in Nevada
Passenger rail transportation in California
Passenger rail transportation in Nevada
Transportation in the Las Vegas Valley
2024 in rail transport
High-speed railway lines in the United States
Railway electrification in the United States
Railway lines in highway medians
Projects established in 2005
Brightline
High-speed rail in the United States